Sapporo Teine (サッポロテイネ) is a recreational center in Teine-ku, Sapporo, Hokkaido, Japan. It comprises many facilities, such as the ski resort (with other facilities, besides ski), the Teineyama Ropeway, and the Sapporo Teine Golf Club fields.

Currently skiing and snowboarding can be performed here. In 1972, Mt. Teine was the site of the first Winter Olympic Games in Asia and hosted the giant slalom and slalom events in alpine skiing.

Facilities
Sapporo Teine ski resort is separated into the Highland Zone, and the Olympia Zone. Other facilities at the ski resort are Highland Ski Center (with lift ticket sales, rental gear, shop, restaurant, coin lockers, nursery, etc.), Olympia House and North Maple (restaurants), Hot Café 1024 (cafeteria), the General Information Booth, and Pandaruman (kid's winter park; snow play, skiing, etc.).

The Highland Zone comprises various kinds of courses for all levels of skiers. Here is also the place to enjoy a great view over the city and the sea of Japan on sunny days.

The Olympia Zone, includes both intermediate and advanced levels courses. At this zone is located the Olympic flame-holder, exactly as it did during the games.

Both zones are open to the public (for skiing and snowboarding practice), between early December and late March, every year.

1972 Winter Olympics
The 1972 Winter Olympics were held  in Sapporo, and Mount Teine hosted the alpine skiing (giant slalom and slalom only), bobsleigh, and luge events (Note: The bobsleigh and luge tracks used for these Winter Olympics were separate tracks.).

Alpine skiing
The first skiing courses were constructed between 1968 and the end of 1970. Requiring additional vertical drop, the downhill events were run on Mount Eniwa.

After the Olympics, Teine has held many important ski events such as; Winter Universiade, Asian Winter Games, and other FIS official competition (the International Miyasama Ski Games), as well as being one of the main facilities for regional and national ski competitions.

Bobsleigh and luge tracks
The tracks were constructed between October 1969 and January 1972. A total of 127 lamps were used to highlight the course for night runs. Costing ¥ 277 million to complete, the luge track was constructed of reinforced concrete and took 1000 man-days to create ice.

No turn names were given for the tracks.

After Nagano was awarded the 1998 Winter Olympics in 1991, the tracks were dismantled.

Access 
 JR Bus: 20 minutes from Teine Station (JR Hokkaido) to Teine Olympia mae Bus stop.

External links

References 

Venues of the 1972 Winter Olympics
Olympic alpine skiing venues
Olympic bobsleigh venues
Olympic luge venues
Bobsleigh, luge, and skeleton tracks
Defunct sports venues in Japan
Ski areas and resorts in Hokkaido
Sports venues in Sapporo
2017 Asian Winter Games Venues
Teine-ku, Sapporo